Enoka Lucas (born April 29, 1984) is a former American football center that last played for the Virginia Destroyers of the United Football League. He was signed by the Houston Texans as an undrafted free agent in 2007. He played college football at Oregon after graduating from Kamehameha Schools.

Lucas was also with the Tampa Bay Buccaneers, Tennessee Titans and Arizona Cardinals.

Professional career

Florida Tuskers
Lucas was signed by the Florida Tuskers of the United Football League on September 3, 2009. He was a part-time starter at center in 2009 before taking over the center job full-time in 2010 for Florida. He resigned with the Virginia Destroyers (formerly the Florida Tuskers) on June 21, 2011 for his third UFL season.

References

External links
Just Sports Stats
Oregon Ducks bio

1984 births
Living people
Kamehameha Schools alumni
American football centers
Oregon Ducks football players
Houston Texans players
Tampa Bay Buccaneers players
Tennessee Titans players
Arizona Cardinals players
Florida Tuskers players
Players of American football from Honolulu
Virginia Destroyers players